Esperia sulphurella is a species of gelechioid moth in the family Oecophoridae. It is found in Europe.

The moth flies from May to June depending on the location.

The larvae feed on dead wood.

Taxonomy
E. sulphurella was first described scientifically by J.C. Fabricius in 1775. Subsequently, the same scientific name was used for several other moths, creating a number of junior homonyms that are all invalid. These include:
 T. sulphurella of Fabricius (1777) is Oecophora bractella
 T. sulphurella of Hübner (1793) is Ypsolophus sulphurella
 T. sulphurella of Haworth (1829) is Povolnya leucapennella

External links
Esperia sulphurella at UKmoths
Lepiforum.de

Oecophorinae
Moths of Europe
Moths of Asia
Taxa named by Johan Christian Fabricius